is a maxi-single released by J-pop singer Kaori Utatsuki on July 29, 2009. This single was also on the I've Sound 10th Anniversary 「Departed to the future」 Special CD BOX, which was released on March 25, 2009.

The coupling song "Senecio: I've in Budokan 2009 Live Ver." is the live version of her first theme song with I've Sound that she performed in their concert in Budokan last January 2, 2009.

The single was released in a limited CD+DVD edition (GNCV-0021). The DVD contains the Promotional Video for "End of Refrain: Chiisana Hajimari".

Track listing 
—4:33
Lyrics: Kotoko
Composition: Tomoyuki Nakazawa
Arrangement: Tomoyuki Nakazawa, Takeshi Ozaki
Senecio: I've in Budokan 2009 Live Ver. -- 4:04
Lyrics: Kotoko
Composition/Arrangement: Tomoyuki Nakazawa
—4:31

I've Sound 10th Anniversary 「Departed to the future」 Special CD BOX sales trajectory

References

2009 singles
Kaori Utatsuki songs
Song recordings produced by I've Sound
Songs with lyrics by Kotoko (musician)
2009 songs